Lindale is an unincorporated community and census-designated place (CDP) in Floyd County, Georgia, United States. It is part of the Rome, Georgia Metropolitan Statistical Area. The population was 4,191 at the 2010 census.

History
A post office called Lindale has been in operation since 1883. The name Lindale might have been selected from a novel a resident had read.

Throughout the 20th century, the community formed around the Lindale Textile Mill located in the center of the community. Since the early part of the 21st century, the building is abandoned. The Mill was owned by the West Point-Pepperell for the majority of its existence, leading to the Lindale community to be commonly referred to as "Pepperell". The local schools, which are part of the Floyd County School System, are named after the mill and use the West Point-Pepperell (currently WestPoint Home) Griffin as the mascot, under the name "Pepperell Dragons".

Geography

Lindale is located in southeastern Floyd County at  (34.193495, -85.173713). It is bordered to the north by the city of Rome, the county seat.

Lindale's borders follow local and state roads, including Booze Mountain Road (for the southern border) and Georgia State Route 101 (for the easternmost city limits).

Demographics

2020 census

As of the 2020 United States census, there were 4,283 people, 1,680 households, and 1,227 families residing in the CDP.

2000 census
As of the census of 2000, there were 4,088 people, 1,682 households, and 1,165 families residing in the CDP. The racial makeup of the CDP was 95.01% White, 1.79% African American, 0.17% Native American, 0.27% Asian, 1.32% from other races, and 1.44% from two or more races. Hispanic or Latino people of any race were 2.74% of the population.

There were 1,682 households, out of which 29.4% had children under the age of 18 living with them, 52.5% were married couples living together, 12.4% had a female householder with no husband present, and 30.7% were non-families. 26.5% of all households were made up of individuals, and 12.9% had someone living alone who was 65 years of age or older. The average household size was 2.42 and the average family size was 2.91.

In the CDP, the population was spread out, with 23.8% under the age of 18, 8.3% from 18 to 24, 28.6% from 25 to 44, 21.7% from 45 to 64, and 17.6% who were 65 years of age or older. The median age was 38 years. For every 100 females, there were 94.1 males. For every 100 females age 18 and over, there were 85.8 males.

The median income for a household in the CDP was $28,486, and the median income for a family was $31,563. Males had a median income of $26,657 versus $21,910 for females. The per capita income for the CDP was $15,844. About 10.8% of families and 16.0% of the population were below the poverty line, including 26.0% of those under age 18 and 11.2% of those age 65 or over.

Education 
It is part of the Floyd County School District.

Pepperell Middle School and Pepperell High school serve the Lindale area.

Notable people
Eric L. Haney, former soldier and writer
Randy Johnson, football player
 Willard Nixon, former pitcher for Boston Red Sox

Media recognition
In 2015, the science fiction film The Divergent Series: Allegiant, the third installment of the Divergent (film) series, was filmed in Lindale, at the Lindale Mill. Lindale is credited in the movie's final credits.

References

Census-designated places in Floyd County, Georgia
Census-designated places in Georgia (U.S. state)
Unincorporated communities in Floyd County, Georgia
Unincorporated communities in Georgia (U.S. state)